The Messerschmitt Me 609 (alternatively Me 309 Zwilling) was a World War II German project which joined two fuselages of the Me 309 fighter prototype together to form a heavy fighter.

Design and development
The project was initiated in response to a 1941 Reich Air Ministry requirement for a new Zerstörer (destroyer) to replace the Bf 110 in a minimum time and with a minimum of new parts. Messerschmitt's response was the Me 609, which would use the failed Me 309 project to form the basis of the new fighter. The Me 609 would have joined the two Me 309 fuselages with a new centre wing section. Only the two inner wheels of the joined Me 309's main landing gears would have been used and would retract into the centre section. This resulted in an unusual four-wheel arrangement. The pilot would have sat in a cockpit located in the port fuselage, with the starboard being smoothed over.

Two versions were planned: a heavy fighter with four or six 30 mm MK 108 cannons, and a Schnellbomber (fast bomber) variant with two 30 mm MK 108 cannons and a bomb load of 1,000 kg (2,200 lb) carried beneath the fuselages. However, by late December 1942, Messerschmitt Me 609 project was cancelled at the drawing board.

Designation 
One source claims that the Me 609 was actually a cover designation for test-ready, late-war Me 262s, not the twin-fuselage Me 309.  However, this claim contradicts most other sources.

Specifications (Me 609, as designed)

See also

References

Sources
 Green, William. War Planes of the Second World War, Fighters, vol. I. London: Hanover House, 1960.
 Lepage, Jean-Denis G.G. Aircraft of the Luftwaffe, 1935-1945: An Illustrated Guide. Jefferson, North Carolina: McFarland & Company, 2009.

External links

Me 609
Abandoned military aircraft projects of Germany
Twin-fuselage aircraft
Low-wing aircraft
Research and development in Nazi Germany
Twin piston-engined tractor aircraft